The boat-billed flycatcher (Megarynchus pitangua) is a passerine bird. It is a large tyrant flycatcher, the only member of the monotypic genus Megarynchus.

It breeds in open woodland with some tall trees from Mexico south to Bolivia and Argentina, and through to Trinidad.

The nest, built by the female, is an open saucer of sticks. The typical clutch is two or three whitish eggs heavily blotched with brown. These are incubated mostly by the female for 17–18 days with a further 24 days to fledging.

Description
 
The head is black with a strong white eyestripe and a concealed yellow crown stripe. The upperparts are olive-brown, and the wings and tail are brown with only faint rufous fringes. The underparts are yellow and the throat is white.

The massive black bill, which gives this species its English and generic names, is the best distinction from the similar great kiskadee, which also has more rufous tail and wings, and lacks the olive tone to the upperparts. The call is a strident trilled nya, nya, nya.

Diet
Boat-billed flycatchers wait on a concealed perch high in a tree and sally out to catch insects (such as cicadas) in flight. They will also take invertebrates off the foliage and eat some berries (of the genera Cissus and Miconia), small wild figs and dry green fruits of Cecropia.

References

Further reading

External links

 
 
 
 

boat-billed flycatcher
Birds of the Amazon Basin
Birds of the Guianas
Birds of the Cerrado
Birds of the Caatinga
Birds of the Pantanal
Birds of Trinidad and Tobago
Birds of Central America
Birds of South America
Birds of the Yucatán Peninsula
Higher-level bird taxa restricted to the Neotropics
boat-billed flycatcher
boat-billed flycatcher
Megarynchus